The 2016–17 Belmont Bruins men's basketball team represented Belmont University during the 2016–17 NCAA Division I men's basketball season. The Bruins, led by 31st-year head coach Rick Byrd, played their home games at the Curb Event Center in Nashville, Tennessee as members of the Ohio Valley Conference in the East Division. They finished the season 23–7, 15–1 in OVC play to win the regular season championship. In the OVC tournament, they lost in the semifinals to Jacksonville State. As a regular season conference champion who failed to win their conference tournament title, they received an automatic bid to the National Invitation Tournament where they defeated Georgia in the first round before losing to Georgia Tech.

Previous season
The Bruins finished the 2015–16 season 20–12, 12–4 in OVC play to win the East Division and the overall OVC regular season. They lost in the semifinals of the OVC tournament to Austin Peay. As a regular season conference champion who failed to win their conference tournament, they received an automatic bid to the National Invitation Tournament where they lost in the first round to Georgia.

Preseason 
In a vote of Ohio Valley Conference head men’s basketball coaches and sports information directors, Belmont was picked to finish as regular season champions of the OVC for the third time in the last four years. Reigning OVC Player of the Year, Evan Bradds, was named OVC Preseason Player of the Year for the 2016–17 season. Taylor Barnette was also selected to the All-OVC Preseason Team.

Roster

Schedule and results

|-
!colspan=9 style=| Regular season

|-
!colspan=9 style="|Ohio Valley Conference tournament

|-
!colspan=9 style="| NIT

References

Belmont Bruins men's basketball seasons
Belmont
Belmont